Rochester Heights Historic District is a historic post-World War II neighborhood and national historic district located  miles southeast of downtown Raleigh, North Carolina.  The district encompasses 137 contributing buildings and 1 contributing structure and was developed between about 1957 and 1964.  The homes are predominantly constructed in the Ranch and Split-level home styles.

It was listed on the National Register of Historic Places in December 2011.

References

External links
 National Register Historic Districts in Raleigh, North Carolina, RHDC
 Rochester Heights Historic District, RHDC

Historic districts on the National Register of Historic Places in North Carolina
Modernist architecture in North Carolina
Neighborhoods in Raleigh, North Carolina
National Register of Historic Places in Raleigh, North Carolina